The sixth season of the Australian Dancing with the Stars TV series premiered on Tuesday 20 February 2007 and concluded on Tuesday 1 May 2007. It featured the following celebrities.

Couples

Singer Kate Ceberano and her partner John-Paul Collins won the series, defeating radio personality Fifi Box and her partner.

Scoring chart
Red numbers indicate the couples with the lowest score for each week.
Green numbers indicate the couples with the highest score for each week.
 indicates the couple (or couples) eliminated that week.
 indicates the returning couple that finished in the bottom two.
 indicates the couple that would have been eliminated had an elimination taken place.
 indicates the winning couple.
 indicates the runner-up couple.
 indicates the third place couple.

{| class="wikitable sortable" style="text-align:center" align="center"
!Couple
!Place
! 1
! 2
! 1+2
! 3
! 4
! 5
! 6
! 7
! 8
! 9
! 10
|-
|align="left"|Kate & John-Paul
| 1
| 29
| 46
| 75
| 32
| 36
| 30
| 30+30=60
| bgcolor=lightblue|34
| 35+35=70
| 39+34=73
| bgcolor="gold"|36+37+40=113
|-
|align="left"|Fifi & Paul G.
| 2
| 31
| 37
| 68
| 34
| 31
| 32
| 30+31=61
| 35
| 33+35=68
| style="background:lightblue;"|28+33=61
| bgcolor=silver| 38+38+38=<span style="color:green;">114</span>
|-
|align="left"|Tim & Natalie
| 3
| 41
| 43
| 84
| 34
| 32
| 35
| 39+34=73
| 33
| bgcolor=lightblue|36+34=70 
| bgcolor=lime| 37+35=72
|colspan=7 bgcolor="darkgray"|
|-
|align="left"|Jamie & Amanda
| 4
| 32
| 29
| 61
| bgcolor=lightblue| 31
| 24
| 31
| 25+34=59
| 36
| bgcolor=orange| 32+32=64
|colspan=7 bgcolor="darkgray"|
|-
|align="left"|David & Eliza
| 5
| 18
| 27
| 45
| 19
| 18
| style="background:lightblue;"|10
| style="background:lightblue;"|4+22=26
| bgcolor=orange| 24
|colspan=7 bgcolor="darkgray"|
|-
|align="left"|Tatiana & Brendan
| 6
| 39
| 35
| 74
| 30
| bgcolor=lightblue|33
| 26
| bgcolor=orange| 28+26=54
|colspan=7 bgcolor="darkgray"|
|-
|align="left"|Todd & Emily
| 7
| 39
| 35
| 74
| 35
| 28
| bgcolor=orange| 27
|colspan=7 bgcolor="darkgray"|
|-
|align="left"|Naomi & Steven
| 8
| 26
| 29
| 55
| 21
| bgcolor=orange| 21
|colspan=7 bgcolor="darkgray"|
|-
|align="left"|Kimberley & Paul Z.
| 9
| 29
| 29
| bgcolor=lightblue| 58
| bgcolor=orange| 29
|colspan=7 bgcolor="darkgray"|
|- 
|align="left"|Wendell & Linda
| 10
| 30
| 25
| bgcolor=orange| 55
|colspan=10 bgcolor="darkgray"|
Todd McKenney remarked, "I only gave him a '1' because I didn't have a '0'".

 Averages 
This table only counts for dances scored on a traditional 40-points scale.
Bruno Tonioli's marks were excluded for this table.

Highest and lowest scoring performances
The best and worst performances in each dance according to the judges' 40-point scale are as follows (guest judges scores are excluded):

Couples' highest and lowest scoring dances
Scores are based upon a 40-point maximum:

Running order

 Week 1 Individual judges scores in the chart below (given in parentheses) are listed in this order from left to right: Todd, Helen, Paul, Mark, Bruno.''
Running order

Week 2 
Musical guests: 
Running order

Week 3 
Musical guests:

Running order

Week 4 
Musical guests:

Running order

Week 5 
Musical guests: 
 
Running order

Week 6 
Musical guests: 
 
Running order

Week 7 
Musical guests:

Running order

Week 8 
Musical guests: Dannii Minogue

Running order

Week 9 
Musical guests:

Running order

Week 10 
Running order

Dance schedule
The celebrities and professional partners will dance one of these routines for each corresponding week.

Week 1 : Cha-cha-cha or Quickstep
Week 2 : Tango or Jive
Week 3 : Foxtrot or Salsa
Week 4 : Waltz or Paso doble
Week 5 : Samba or Rumba
Week 6 : One unlearned Ballroom or Latin dance from weeks 1-5
Week 7 : One unlearned Ballroom or Latin dance from weeks 1-6
Week 8 : Two unlearned Ballroom or Latin dances from weeks 1-7
Week 9 : Final unlearned Ballroom or Latin dance from weeks 1-8 & Argentine Tango
Week 10 : Two Favourite Dances of the Season & Freestyle

Dance chart

 Highest scoring dance
 Lowest scoring dance

References

Season 06
2007 Australian television seasons